Operation Cobra was a military operation by Australia's Services Reconnaissance Department during World War II in Timor in 1944. A team of five soldiers were inserted on to Japanese occupied Timor

It consisted of Captain Cashman, radio operator E.J. Liversidge, and three native Timorese,  Sergeant Paulo da Silva, Sergeant Cosme Soares and Sergeant Sancho da Silva. They did not know the prior Operation Lagarto had been captured and compromised and the troops were captured.

The naval component of the campaign was known as Operation Bulldozer.

Liversidge died on 20 November 1944. Cashman survived.

References

Further reading

Cobra
1944 in Portuguese Timor
Cobra
South West Pacific theatre of World War II
Cobra